The Lee Valley Lions are an ice hockey team based in Leyton, East London where they play at the Lee Valley Ice Centre. They are the senior Ice Hockey team at the rink, with other users including the affiliated Lee Valley Lions Junior Ice Hockey Club, the Eastern Stars and London Devils recreational teams and the University of London Ice hockey Club.

The original Lions 1984-1995

The Lee Valley Lions were originally formed in early 1984 and initially competed in a series of friendly games. The 1984/85 season was their first  competitive season. The team competed in the British Heineken League Division One (BD1), the second tier of British Ice Hockey, where they finished a credible sixth place in their first season. The 1985/86 season saw the Lions dominated the league alongside Solihull and Telford. The team finally finished in second place, following a 6–7 loss in their last game at third placed Telford Tigers on the final day of the league season. This was followed by the success of lifting the British League Division One Trophy, the only silverware won by the Lee Valley Lions to date.

The early successes of the team were never reached again, although in 1986 the Lions recorded what probably remains their biggest win in the club's history with a 3–2 victory over Premier Division Nottingham Panthers in the Autumn Cup. The seasons 1986/87 through to 1989/90 saw the Lions languishing near the bottom of the league, never finishing higher than seventh place (1987/88). In fact in 1988/89 the Lions would have been relegated if it was not for the expulsion of the Deeside Dragons from the league.

In 1990 British Engine became the main sponsor of the team, prompting a change in the team's colours from the original white, green and blue to red, black and white. The new sponsorship could not change the form of the team and the  seasons 1990/91 through to 1994/1995 were no better than what had preceded them with the Lions firmly rooted near the foot of the league table. Relegation once again loomed at the end of the 1994/95 season, however, financial difficulties meant that the Lee Valley Lions ceased playing at the end of the season.

The Lions roar again 2005-2008

In 2005, at the request of the Rink Operators, the Lee Valley Lions were reformed under former player and then Junior Head Coach Eddie Joseph. It was to compete in the English National Ice Hockey League with the team mainly comprising players from the junior system and a smattering of former players from the first incarnation. The team also returned to its traditional colours of white, green and blue. In their return season the Lions struggled, suffered a number of heavy defeats and failed to register any points. The team finished bottom of the league with a record of played 20, lost 20. The following season (2006/07) saw wholesale changes made to the team with new coach Sergei Smolenko being brought in alongside former Chelmsford Chieftains Captain James Hatfull to bolster the team's experience. Whilst there were significant improvements on the ice, the league positions during this period were frustratingly unchanged with the Lions never finishing higher than seventh (2007/08) under the Russian. With the reorganisation of the league structure for the beginning of 2008/09 season, the Lee Valley Lions found themselves competing in the English National Ice Hockey League South Two, (which itself was renamed the National Ice Hockey League South Two in time for the 2012/13 season).

There was some small non league related success achieved at the end of the 2007/08 season when the Lions travelled to the Isle of Wight for the first Vectis Tigers "Ice Cube Tournament" which involved a number of English National Ice Hockey League and senior recreational teams. After remaining unbeaten and winning their group on goal difference ahead of the hosts, the Lions beat the former English Premier Ice Hockey League side the Solihull Barons in the semi final 4–1, followed by a 7–0 win in the final over the London University Dragons.

The doldrum years 2009-2014
The 2009/10 season brought a period of stagnation and under performance for the Lee Valley Lions, unaltered by two changes in Head Coach (Ian Prince and then David Richards). Between 2009/10 and 2014/15 the best final league position achieved was seventh in the 2011/12 season.

An upturn in fortunes 2015-2017
First under the coaching of Garry Dodds & then former Netminder George Alley, there appeared to be an upturn in the fortunes of the Lee Valley Lions. The 2014/15 season saw them finish in fifth place, the best league position since the 1985/86 season when they had been runners up in the old British league Division One. The following year the team improved again to finish fourth and the 2016/17 season brought another creditable fifth in the league. Unfortunately, this was only a hiatus to the usual indifferent form which returned to haunt the team the following season.

A time for reflection 2017-2021
The last season of George Alley's tenure as Head Coach (2017/18) coincided with a league restructure which pitted very strong former National Ice Hockey League South 1 teams such as Bracknell Hornets, Chelmsford Chieftains, Oxford City Stars and Solent Devils against the traditionally weaker South 2 sides. This saw the return of the Lions struggling at the wrong end of the league. Only one league win was registered via the forfeiture of a game by the Swindon Wildcats NIHL2 team. The end of the season saw both the coach and the majority of the team leave. The 2018/19 season started with James Joseph leading the team in his first coaching position, whilst retaining his role as the club's longest serving Defenceman. With a short benched team, mainly consisting of veteran, former recreational and junior players experiencing their first taste of senior league hockey, the Lions struggled for any consistency and were the recipients of some very one sided scores. The team did, however, manage a single win during the season, 5–0 away to Swindon Wildcats NIHL2. The 2019/20 season was cut short by the COVID-19 pandemic. Whilst arguably playing better hockey than the year before, the team failed to register a win. The Lions did not ice during the 2020/21 season due to the league cancelling all games due to the ongoing pandemic. In June 2021 it was announced that the home of the team, the Lee Valley Ice Centre would be closing for a 16-month period for major renovation work, with the team playing out of the Cambridge Ice Arena.

Honours

Heineken League British Division One League Runners Up: 1985/86

Heineken League British Division One Trophy Winners: 1985/86

Club roster 2022-2023

Statistical records

Top ten appearances
League, Cup & Play Offs; as at end of 2021/22 Season

Top ten Points Scorers
League, Cup & Play Offs; as at end of 2021/22 Season

Top ten goal scorers
League, Cup & Play Offs; as at end of 2021/22 Season

Top ten goal assists 
League, Cup & Play Offs; as at end of 2021/22 Season

Top ten penalty minutes 
League, Cup & Play Offs; as at end of 2021/22 Season

Top ten points to game ratio 
League, Cup & Play Offs; as at end of 2021/22 Season (Players with under 20 appearances not included)

Top ten goals to game ratio 
League, Cup & Play Offs; as at end of 2021/22 Season (Players with under 20 appearances not included)

Top ten assists to game ratio 
League, Cup & Play Offs; as at end of 2021/22 Season (Players with under 20 appearances not included)

Top ten penalty minutes to games ratio 
League, Cup & Play Offs; as at end of 2021/22 Season (Players with under 20 appearances not included)

Top ten save percentages 
League, Cup & Play Offs; as at end of 2021/22 Season (Players with under 20 appearances not included)

Retired numbers

Head coaches

General Managers

Club captains

Season-by-season record

External links
Lee Valley Lions official website

Ice hockey teams in London
Sport in the London Borough of Waltham Forest
Leyton